Roseanne Supernault is a Canadian film and television actress, best known for her roles as Natalie Stoney in the television series Blackstone and as the title character in the 2013 film Maïna. Originally from East Prairie, Alberta, she is of Métis and Cree descent.

Career 
Supernault won the Best Actress Award at the 2013 American Indian Film Festival for her performance in Maïna.

A graduate of the Victoria School of Performing and Visual Arts in Edmonton, Alberta, she has also appeared in the films Rhymes for Young Ghouls and Through Black Spruce, and the television series Rabbit Fall, Into the West and Mixed Blessings.

Supernault runs acting workshops in Vancouver for Indigenous youths and has been active in the Idle No More movement.

Filmography

Film

Television

References

External links

Canadian film actresses
Canadian television actresses
Actresses from Alberta
First Nations actresses
Cree people
Canadian Métis people
Living people
Year of birth missing (living people)